Francisco del Rosario Sánchez (March 9, 1817 – July 4, 1861) was a Dominican revolutionary, politician, and former president of the Dominican Republic. He is considered by Dominicans as the second leader of the 1844 Dominican War of Independence, after Juan Pablo Duarte and before Matías Ramón Mella. Widely acknowledged as one of the founding fathers of the Dominican Republic, and the only martyr of the three, he is honored as a national hero. In addition, the Order of Merit of Duarte, Sánchez and Mella is named partially in his honor.

Following Duarte's exile, Sánchez took leadership of the independence movement, while continuing to correspond with Duarte through his relatives. Under Sánchez, the Dominicans would successfully overthrow Haitian rule and declare Dominican independence on February 27, 1844. With the success of the separation from Haiti, Sánchez took office as the Dominican Republic's first intern president before ceded his position.

But his ideas of an independent state were fiercely challenged by many within the sector who felt that the new nation's independence was only a temporary success. Because of his patriotic ideals, Sánchez, like many of his peers, would be on the receiving end of these political struggles. His main political rival was none other than the military general, Pedro Santana. His status as a patriot came with many unfortunate consequences, including incarceration, deprived of his assets, many exiles, and worst of all, the death of his companions.

By 1861, his worst fears of the end of the republic came to reality upon learning that the pro-annexation group led by Santana agreed to reintergrate Dominican Republic back to colonial status. With no time to waste, Sánchez rushed back to his homeland to challeged this decision, but was lured into a trap by the very same people who allied with him, leading to his unfortunate death on July 4, 1861. His death triggered a national outrage throughout the island, and marking a new era of struggle for independence, which was eventually achieved in 1865.

Background

Early years and family life
Sanchez was born on March 9, 1817, in the city of Santo Domingo, during the years of a 12-year era known to Dominicans as España Boba. This period was plagued into an economic and cultural crisis, in view of the fact that, when Juan Sánchez Ramírez managed to get the "Junta de Bandillo" at the end of 1808 to decide to return to Spain or reincorporate it after winning Ferrand and France, in the Battle of Palo Hincado, who applied the Treaty of Basel in 1804, through which Spain ceded this part of the Island to France in 1795. Spain was under the Napoleonic invasion, which prevented meeting the requirements of the reacquired colony.

Sánchez was the son of Olaya del Rosario Belén (1791–1849), a creole woman of light complexion who descends from European (Canarian) and African ancestors, and Narciso "Seño Narcisazo" Sánchez Ramona (1789–1869), a tall man who is a descendant of slaves. Because of their different racial and social-economical status (hers being superior to his), Narciso Sánchez and Olaya del Rosario married after a special authorisation given by the mayor.

His mother was a hairdresser who produced combs, while his father worked in the meat trade, selling, butchering and raising cattle.

His surnames are inverted because his parents were not married at the time of his birth, marrying in 1819.

Sanchez had six children with several different women, the first being Felícita Martínez, with whom he procreated Mónica, born on January 30, 1838, when Sánchez was 20 years old. Some years later he procreated María Gregoria (Goyita), born on November 30, 1841, with María Evarista Hinojosa. Later, with Leoncia Leydes Rodríguez from Curaçao, he had Leoncia. Later with Mercedes Pembrén Chevalier he procreated Petronila.

On April 4, 1849, he married Balbina de Peña Pérez, with whom he procreated Juan Francisco and Manuel de Jesús. His son Juan Francisco was Minister of Finance in the government of Ulises Heureaux and was part of the government cabinet of also President Carlos Morales Languasco. Manuel de Jesús, on the other hand, died in infancy. 

The eldest of 11 children, Sánchez grew up in a very nationalistic family. He first received his education from his mother, and later by the Peruvian priest Gaspar Hernández, a patriot who encouraged the young Sánchez to follow in his family's footsteps. He was also influenced by his father and aunt, Maria Trinidad Sánchez, both involved in the movement "Revolution of Los Alcarrizos," an early resistance that attempted to libertate Dominicans from Haitian rule under the dictatorship of Jean-Pierre Boyer, who invaded in 1822 and brought the whole island under his control. Unfortunately, this conspiracy was eventually discovered by Boyer, who order all those involved to be executed. Narciso, however, was imprisoned. This action not only caused Olaya to suffer, but it also accumulated into a long lasting fear and worry for her children and husband, who by now was marked as an enemy by the Haitians. And as the young Sánchez grew up emulating his father's revolutionary footsteps, her bitterness and concerns would transcend into the future.

His childhood was spent in the framework of the period of Haitian domination of the eastern part of the island, which began in 1821 after the failure of the independence initiative of the enlightened José Núñez de Cáceres, which historians refer to as the "Ephemeral Independence."

In his youth, Sánchez used to accompany his father in the work of managing agricultural properties, which allowed him to interact with people of different social classes. He had a love for culture, he was fascinated with the Bible and even enjoyed reading material by Greek and Roman authors. Historian Ramón Lugo Lovatón described Sánchez as a slender man, with a singular appearance, fine manners, education and careful way of speaking, who played various musical instruments and recited poetry and conquered the heart of Curaçao Leoncia Rodríguez, with whom he had offspring. His skills opened the doors for him in Curaçao, where one of his exiles lived and was a Spanish teacher.

Recruitment into La Trinitaria
 
One day, while attending philosophy classes, he was approached by Juan Pablo Duarte, then 25 years old, who also attended these classes and was immediately intrigued by Sánchez's level of intellect. In 1838, Duarte founded the movement La Trinitaria, a nationalistic organization that intends to bring freedom to the Dominican people, who during this time were living in tyranny under Haitian rule. The main objective of this movement was to movement was to not only overthrow Haitian rule of Santo Domingo, but to establish an independent state free of foreign power. Seeing Sánchez as a perfect candidate for membership, Duarte didn't think twice before recruiting him. Sánchez had traveled to the U.S. and Europe as a young man. His vision of the cause was the typical republican goal of the Age of Enlightenment.

With his recruitment, it didn't take long for Sánchez to stand out for his industriousness and determination. Little by little, he gained a leading position in the organization, becoming a fundamental figure in the daily work to achieve the objectives that gave rise to it. Eventually, not only would he prove to be a vital asset for the cause, but it would also allow him to earn Duarte's faith in him, placing his full trust on the young revolutionary.

However, the situation intensified when the new Haitian president, Charles Rivière-Herard, whom had previously allied with the Dominicans to overthrow Boyer, marched to Santo Domingo at the head of 10,000 troops to arrest the Trinitarios after discovering their plans. Learning of this action, Sanchez immediately leaves Los Llanos and heads straight for Santo Domingo, swimming across the Ozama River to notify Duarte of Herard's arrival. Unfortunately, many members of the movement, including Duarte, were arrested.

Substitute leader for Duarte
Juan Pablo Duarte's exile took place at the last and most crucial stage of the struggle. But it was when Duarte was exiled and in hiding in Venezuela that Sánchez became the central presence in the Dominican revolt. In 1843, when Duarte went into exile in Curaçao for fear of being assassinated or imprisoned by the Haitian authorities, Sánchez, then 25 years old, assumed the leadership of the independence movement La Trinitaria, where he presided over the group's meetings and expanded contacts with representatives of the most important social sector in the city, with the collaboration of fellow member Matías Ramón Mella, but in order to avoid being subdued by the Haitians, Sánchez spread a rumor that he had died of an illness.

Sanchez's revolutionary work was intense. He originally intended to consummate independence at the end of 1843 with only the Trinitarian forces. This made Sánchez, along with Vicente Celestino Duarte, request in letter assistance from Duarte:

Sánchez took the lead as the prime mover of the independence movement, maintaining contact with Duarte through his relatives. While educated and having taught himself Latin, English, and French later in life, he is mostly remembered as a man of action. In the proceedings that took place just before the proclamation of independence on February 27, 1844, Sánchez was elected by his peers in as Commander in Arms and Chief of the Government Junta in the nascent republic. This was quite a recognition and a testament to his virtues. In the beginning of January 1844, Sánchez drafted the Dominican Declaration of Independence, which was handed over to conservative Tomás Bobadilla, for publishing, at the suggestion of Mella.

In one of the paragraphs of the manifesto, Sánchez denotes his firm decision to achieve the objective contained in the Trinitarian oath:

Proclamation of independence

Meeting at the house of Sánchez, on February 24, the members of La Trinitaria discussed on the plans on the uprising, which they agreed would be set for February 27. A day later, the rebels were sent to various parts of the country for the purpose of finalizing the agreements made during the meeting. In addition to Sánchez and Mella, Vicente Celestino Duarte (brother of Duarte), José Joaquín Puello, those of La Concha (Jacinto and Tomás), Juan Alejandro Acosta and others attended that meeting. At the proposal of some of his companions, among whom were Félix Mercenario, Manuel María Valverde, Manuel Jiménez and Mariano Echavarría, it was agreed that Sánchez would preside over the Governing Board that was to direct the destinies of the nascent republic.

On the night of February 27, Sánchez and his men seized the Ozama Fortress in the capital of Santo Domingo. The Haitian garrison stationed in the city was caught by surprise, apparently betrayed by one of their sentinels, and was forced to flee the scene. After this, Sanchez marched to the tip of Puerta Del Conde. Mella, who had just arrived in the city, fired his legendary blunderbuss into the air, and at that moment, Sánchez raised the first independent Dominican flag, shouting at the top of his lungs, the national slogan, Dios, Patria, Y Libertad, (God, Homeland, and Freedom), proclaiming to the world the birth of the new independent nation: The Dominican Republic. A new republic, now free of foreign rule, had now been born in the form of a republican and democratic government. Sánchez was just 26 years old when this took place.

First Dominican Republic

As agreed, his first act after declaration of independence was to take presidency of the Central Governing Board, designed to govern over the nation in the wake of its independence. The main purpose of this board was two lead the country against upcoming attacks from the Haitians, who rejected the notion of Dominican Republic being its own separate state. Sánchez was informed that during this time, Haiti was preparing for a military advancement into the country, determined to reunite the island once again. In response to this, the Central Government Board sent the generals Pedro Santana and his brother, Ramón, to the south, while Sánchez and Mella were commanded to Santiago. This attack resulted in the Battle of Azua, fought on March 19. This invasion was crushed by the Dominican army. Unfortunately, Haiti refused to give up, attacks would continue to transpire, thus precipitating into a series of invasions over the next 12 years. Sánchez ceded his position to Bobadilla after serving in office for 24 hours.

Sánchez had anticipated for his predecessors to follow Duarte's ideals to maintain an independent state free of any foreign power. But these ideas were tossed to the ground due to opposing sides who felt that the new nation was not financially and economy able to withstand on its own, especially in the wake of the upcoming threats by the Haitians. And thus, this began a new era for the Dominican Republic tainted with violent political standoffs.

For example, upon discovering Bobadilla's attempt to annex the new nation to France, Sánchez, along with Mella, led a revolt which subsequently displaced Bobadilla, and reinstalled Sánchez as president in June 1844. Simultaneously, Sánchez would be toppled in another coup d'état led by the wealthy caudillo, Pedro Santana. Santana immediately declared Sánchez, Mella, and Duarte, who had just returned to country, as traitors to the homeland and were forced into exile. This action would be the start of the fall out between the independence Trinitarios and the pro-annexation sectors of the nation.

However, tragedy struck while on board the ship, which crashed off the coast of Ireland, killing many of the people on the ship. The survivors, of which included Sánchez and Mella, found themselves in Dublin. In December 1844, they relocated to the United States, and later settling in Curaçao.

His life in Curaçao was very simple. He took a job as a teacher, where he taught Spanish and other subjects in the company of companions of his friend, Juan José Illás. This allowed him to meet Leoncia Rodríguez, a Curaçaoan woman, with whom he established a romantic relationship, thus conceiving a daughter. However, Sánchez had received the tragic news that his aunt, Maria Trinidad Sánchez, had been tortured and executed by Santana for refusing to name the conspirators against him on February 27, 1845, exactly one year after the independence from Haiti. Sanchez's elder half-brother, Andrés, Nicolás de Barías and José del Carmen Figueroa were also shot.

In 1848, Manuel Jimenes, the newly elected president, granted an amnesty which allowed the return of Sanchez and many of the exiled patriots back to the country. Sanchez returned to the Dominican Republic during a very crucial time. He had returned just in time to find that his parents, Olaya del Rosario and Narsisso Sanchez, were still alive. However, by the beginning of February 1849, Olaya del Rosario became seriously ill. Longing to enjoy her presence, both Sánchez and his father came to an agreement that her end was near. He continued to be by her side until her unfortunate death on March 2, 1849. Before her death, Sánchez reconnected with his old girlfriend, Balbina Peña, later marrying her. The two would remain wed until Sánchez's death.

On his return, Sanchez held many important positions in government. He was appointed Commander of Arms for the city of Santo Domingo by Jimenes. However, almost immediately after assuming office, Faustin Soulouque, the new ruler of Haiti, ensued a new invasion into the territory. This invasion accumulated into the Battle of Las Carreras, in which Sánchez participated with Mella, Santana, and Antonio Duvergé. Following the decisive victory of the Dominicans, Sánchez wrote a testimony, in which he writes:

Sánchez even addressed to the nation, in regards to Santana's resounding victory with following: 

Serving as Public Defender, on the Court of Appeals and the Supreme Court, his most prolific case was that of Santana's case against war general Antonio Duvergé, in which took place during Santana's campaign in 1849. Although Duvergé would be acquitted, this did not ease the tension between him and Santana due to Santana's pro-annexation plans. Throughout this ordeal, Sánchez retracted his attempts to harass Santana, despite the fact that Santana had ordered his aunt and brother to be executed four years earlier. This was due to the fact that in exchange for Sánchez to be permitted to remain in the interior of the country, he was forced to agree with the prevailing conservative politics. 

However, relations between Sánchez and Santana reached a breaking point when Santana succeeded in expelling Buenaventura Báez from the country. This resulted into a fierce struggle between the two politicians, of which Sánchez, like Duvergé, sided with the latter. During this time, Baecism had gained the support of  all those who had became adversaries to Santana's growing despotism. Báez supporters consisted mostly of young educated people with liberal convictions from the city of Santo Domingo. To Sánchez, he saw this side much too familiar to that of his political stance, which allowed him to compromise with Báez upon realizing that Santana's authority could be questioned. 

Around this time, Sánchez was approached by Pedro E. Pelletier and Pedro Ramón de Mena, conspirators who organized a group seeking to overthrow Santana and reinstall Báez as president. Earlier on March 25, a rebellion that aimed to overthrow Santana failed. Apperently, Duvergé was involved in that conspiracy. As a result, Duvergé, his 23 hear old son, Tomás de la Concha, and many others were executed on Santana's orders on April 11, 1855. When this failed, Sánchez would be exiled to Curaçao for the second time. There, he established a strong relationship with Báez, who realized the importance of being supported by someone of stature such as Sánchez. He would be allowed to return in August 1856 when Santana resigned and Manuel de Regla Mota became president.

When Baez returned to office for a second term, Sánchez prepared to support him to expel Santana's influence over the nation. However, when considered for candidacy, Sánchez rejected, believing that Baez made a better candidate. With his presidency, he appointed Sánchez as governor of the province of Santo Domingo and even Commander of Arms for the city, although Sánchez would retain this position in discreet.

Interestingly, when José María Cabral took Santana prisoner to Santo Domingo, to later deport him to Martinique, Sánchez allowed Santana to stay at his residence, and even treated him with compassion. This action was met with criticism, especially given the fact that Santana had previously exiled him twice, and even ordered the execution of his aunt and brother some 12 years earlier.

On July 7, 1857, Báez faced an uprising Santiago due to the issue of a large quantity of paper money that was used to purchase tobacco crop. This action gave an uneasy feeling to politicians in the Cibao, who felt that the government did not satisfy their interests. Over the next few days, nearly the entire nation adhered to the provisional government led by José Desiderio Valverde. But despite this, the troops were unable to attack the city.

Fortunately for Santana, this allowed him to regain his political status and even gave him the leadership that surrounded Santo Domingo, still recognizing Santana's military capacity. The siege on the city carried on for nearly a year, though Santana refrain launching a counterstrike; a large portion of the city's population were in favor, of which included Sánchez, and Cabral. Both men were placed as the city's head of defense, where each launched their own offensive methods that took them to Majorra a few days after the outbreak of the Cibaeno Revolution. He would later resign from his position and, as agreed by ability parties, he would be allowed to remain in the country without persecution. He continued his life as a lawyer, away from political affairs.

Annexation to Spain

     
However, it was during this period that political and economic disorder plagued the Caribbean nation. With the Dominican War of Independence coming to a close, the country had inherited a serious amount of debt due to Santana's heavy spending of the wars, as well as the bankrupted treasury left behind during Báez's time in office. Santana's misrule of the power combined with Báez corrupt regime left a devastating effect on the nation's economy. This, along with consistent fears of another attack from the Haitians, gave justification for the nation to be annex to a foreign power.

Sánchez, who had been under surveillance for months following the revolution, was suspected of taking part of a renewed conspiracy against Santana's government, once again with the purpose of restoring the power back to Baez. Although this time, Sánchez did not take part in this group. But despite of this this, Santana considered his overall presence as a serious threat to his administration, and for the third and final time, in 1859, Sánchez was exiled and banished from the country, this time to Saint Thomas, where his existence was full of privations, surviving practically in a state of destitution and much of the time, battling illness. 

Ultimately, in 1861, Santana struck a deal with Spain to reintegrate the Dominican Republic back to colonial status in exchange for honorary privileges. Learning of this action from Manuel Rodríguez Objío, who sailed from Dominican Republic upon hearing Santana's plans, Sánchez was outraged, and took lead of the opposition. Báez, on the other hand, decided not to take part in the opposition, believing that the annexation was inevitable, and once consummated, the conflicts between the Spanish and Santana would only intensify, giving Santana more opportunities to attain commanding positions. From this moment, Sánchez severed all ties Báez, reverting him back to his Trinitario origins, giving him the renewed stature of a hero who embodied the ideals of freedom. However, Báez left his supporters free to do as they please, since he could not prevent them from taking part in stopping the annexation. In addition, Báez's lieutenants also accepted Sánchez's leadership. 

Returning to Curaçao, Sánchez set the structure for the purposes. He ordered a formation called the Dominican Revolutionary Board, of which his part was composed chiefly of Baecistas such as Manuel María Gautier and Valentín Ramírez Báez. The second figure of the movement was led by Cabral, who despite being a supporter of Báez, had always maintained his ideals of independence of judgment, along with liberal and national position, of which has shown through his subsequent evolution. Also on board of the movement was his old comrade and fellow Trinitario, Pedro Alejandro Piña, who had always stood firm on all national struggles. 

But without resources, there was little he could do. During this time, he attempted to gain support from various other countries but to no avail. Faced with no other choice, Sánchez ended up traveling to Haiti, where he asked president Fabre Geffrard for support to liberate the Dominican Republic from Spanish neocolonialism. Addressing the president, Sánchez says:

Although initially skeptical, he eventually agreed to give aid to the rebels due to the possibility of Spain stretching its power to the rest of the island. With this, he managed to recruit other exiled Dominicans and obtain resources to organize a force of 500 men. This expedition would later be revered to as the Dominican Regeneration Movement. 

Before entering the Dominican Republic, he published his final manifesto on January 20, 1861. In it, he addressed a proclamation to the Dominican people, in which he denounced:

Likewise, Francisco del Rosario Sánchez noted:

In the proclamation Sánchez called the attention of the Dominicans:

In another letter, written to Damián Báez, on January 16, four days earlier, Sánchez firmly asserts:

With his mission now set, Sánchez returned to Saint Thomas, while his followers congregated in Haiti, coming from Saint Thomas to Curaçao. His plans also won support from Dominican soldiers who had arrived in Haiti a short time before, such as Domingo Ramírez and Fernando Tabera. The Baecista leaders, however, preferred to remain in Port-au-Prince.

Capture and Execution

Entrance to Dominican Republic

Entering through Hondo Valle, (in the province of present-day Elías Piña), on June 1, 1861, Sánchez led his force in an attempt to overthrow Santana, making his way towards Santo Domingo. Fernando Taveras took the route through Neiba, while Cabral took the route through Las Matas de Cruz. Sánchez managed to cross through Vallejuelo with ease, eventually arriving in El Cercado. Recognized by authorities, he was able to gain the cooperation of the prestigious De Oleo family.

Simultaneously, however, Spain had been made aware of Haiti's involvement into the expedition, and threatened to invade if the support continued, thus causing Geffrard to widthdraw his support. This sudden turn of events was first received by Cabral, who immediately returned to safety in Haiti. Once this news reached Sánchez, he also began his retreat back to Haiti, but not before keeping open friendships to the local bosses in the city.

But Sánchez was unaware that the inhabitants of El Cercado, who had previously allied with him, also widthdrew their support. They had considered themselves lost in the face of the failure of their enterprise, and resolved to save themselves from the punishment of the government. This act would ultimately seal Sánchez's fate. As Sánchez left for Haiti, he was stunned that Santiago De Oleo was not present.

As for De Oleo, he knew the exact route where Sánchez and his companions would take, and thus he set an ambush for him. As planned, when Sánchez arrived at the exit of El Cercado, he walked right into an ambush, which led to a violent confrontation. The men put up a struggle, but in the end, most were captured. In the scuffle, Sánchez was wounded in the groin, and was offered a horse by Ogando to take him back to Haiti. Sánchez, however, refused this, and was ultimately captured as well. He was then handed over to the annexation forces, now led by Santana, who in an attempt to exploit Sánchez's rebellious actions as treacherous, decreed that he and his captured followers to stand trial and face sentence in July 1861.

The Trial

During the trial, it was clear that it lacked probity. Suffering from serious injuries, Sánchez tried to shift the entirety of the expedition solely on his shoulders in hopes that the lives of his followers be spared in exchange for his, but to no avail. His defense was very powerful; believing that his actions could not be judged under Dominican law, let alone Spanish law, the latter of which Sánchez argued, hadn't been enforced. He then attempted to justify his actions by asserting:

In another account, Sánchez was also quoted with saying:

Before he was shot, Sánchez asked to be wrapped around the Dominican flag, and as he heard the command "Fire" Sánchez shouted even louder, in reference to the end of the Republic and Polish patriot Tadeo Kosciuszko:

Sánchez, two-time hero and founding father of the Dominican Republic, was shot dead on July 4, 1861, in San Juan de la Maguana, at the young age of 44. Among others were: Félix Mota, Domingo Piñeyro Boscán, Rudecindo de León, Francisco Martínez, Julián Morris y Morris, Juan Erazo, Benigno del Castillo, Gabino Simonó Guante, Manuel Baldemora, José Antonio Figueroa, Pedro Zorilla, Luciano Solís, José Corporán (or Ciprián), Juan Gregorio Rincón, José de Jesus Paredes, Epifanio Jiménez (or Sierra), Juan Dragon, León García, and Juan de la Cruz.

Aftermath

The execution of Sánchez sent shockwaves throughout island. It sent a clear message to the patriots of the fate of anyone who dared to challenge Spanish rule. However, the struggle for independence continued to mount as a new era of patriots would arise and join the cause, thus triggering the interlude for the Dominican Restoration War.

Following Sánchez's death, his sister, Socorro was exiled to St. Thomas for two years. When she returned to the Dominican Republic in 1863, she was imprisoned for a year for outspokenness against the regime.

Gregorio Luperón, a then 22 year old patriot from Puerto Plata, expressed his opposition of the Spanish presence in Dominican Republic, and was arrested. However, he managed to escape from prison and sought refuge in the U.S., and later Haiti. He returned to the country though Monti Cristi, where he would begin his revolt against Spanish rule, and Pedro Santana, who at this point was now ruling the country under military dictatorship, in support of Spain.

Duarte, hearing of the country's annexation to Spain, returned to his homeland once to take part in the struggle for independence. Mella, despite his financial crumble and illness, also joined in the cause to liberate the Dominican Republic from Spain.

Eventually, these actions, as well as those of many others paid off. In 1865, Queen Isabella II, realizing that she could not fare off against the Dominicans, withdrew her support and called off her remaining troops from the country, thereby restoring the nation's independence and ending the last Spanish threat to the Dominican Republic. Sánchez never lived to see this transpire.

Legacy

Sánchez's legacy is forever engraved into the memory of the Dominican Republic. His contributions to politics, nationalism, and ideals of an independent Dominican state marked him as a true icon for the nation. Some historians have credited him as the true father of the nation due to his status as the leader of the independence movement following Duarte's exile in Venezuela. Many Dominicans even consider him to be the strongest of the founding fathers. Brave, honest, bold, and brash, Sánchez's qualities set him apart from many patricians, making the honorable act of sacrificing his life for the nation.

 He is entombed in a mausoleum, Altar de la Patria, at the Count's Gate (Puerta del Conde) alongside Duarte and Mella, at the location of the start of the War of Independence.
 In the province of Samaná, the city of Sánchez is named in his honor.
 Many schools in the Dominican Republic are named in his honor. 
 Streets in many parts of the Dominican Republicare named after him.
 A neighborhood in Santiago de Los Caballeros is named in his honor.
 In San Juan de la Maguana, (in the province of present-day San Juan), the location where Sánchez was executed, a park is named after him along with a memorial statue dedicated to his legacy.
 Sánchez is solely depicted on the 5 Dominican peso note and coin; he is also depicted on the 100 Dominican peso note alongside Duarte and Mella.
 A national anthem titled "Himno a Francisco del Rosario Sánchez" is dedicated to his legacy.

See also 

 History of the Dominican Republic 
 President of the Dominican Republic 
 España Boba 
 Haitian occupation of Santo Domingo 
 Dominican War of Independence
 Spanish occupation of the Dominican Republic
 Dominican Restoration War
 Juan Pablo Duarte
 Matías Ramón Mella
 Socorro Sánchez del Rosario
 María Trinidad Sánchez

Notes

References 

People from Santo Domingo
1817 births
1861 deaths
Dominican Republic people of Canarian descent
Executed politicians
Executed Dominican Republic people
19th-century Dominican Republic people
19th-century Dominican Republic lawyers
19th-century rebels
19th-century executions by Spain
Dominican Republic military personnel
Presidents of the Dominican Republic
Justice ministers of the Dominican Republic
Dominican Republic governors
People of the Dominican War of Independence
Dominican Republic revolutionaries
Dominican Republic independence activists
Dominican Republic military leaders
Mixed-race Dominicans
Dominican Republic politicians
Caribbean people
Caribbean political people
Hispanic and Latino
Latin American people